This is a list of notable alumni, faculty, and students, from the University of Southern California. Those individuals who qualify for multiple categories have been placed under the section for which they are best known.

Academia

Architecture

Art

Astronauts

Athletics

American football 
The University of Southern California has had a number of notable American football players. The following list includes all former USC football players who have articles on Wikipedia. Please note: some former players may be listed elsewhere due to other achievements (i.e. John Wayne and Ward Bond, became better known as actors; Quincy Woods became better known as an Olympian, etc.).

 George Achica – Consensus All-American
 Erik Affholter (born 1966) – NFL wide receiver
 DelVaughn Alexander
 Marcus Allen – Heisman Trophy winner, College Football Hall of Fame Pro Football Hall of Fame
 Marcell Allmond
 John Allred
 Charley Ane
 Sam Anno
 Marger Apsit
 Kevin Arbet
 Jon Arnett – College Football Hall of Fame
 Earl Audet
 Don Avery
 Red Badgro – Pro Football Hall of Famer
 Bill Bain
 Johnny Baker – College Football Hall of Fame, All-American
 Terry Baker (J.D. 1968) – College Football Hall of Fame, Heisman Trophy winner at Oregon State, played quarterback in NFL and CFL
 Sam Baker – two-time All-American
 Chip Banks
 Al Bansavage
 Bradford Banta
 Jack Banta
 Kurt Barber
 Nate Barragar
 Al Barry
 Joe Barry
 Mike Battle
 Pete Beathard
 Hal Bedsole
 Ricky Bell – College Football Hall of Fame
 Duane Bickett
 Darnell Bing
 Bob Blackman
 Mel Bleeker (1920–1996), National Football League player
 John David Booty
 Tony Boselli
 Mark Boyer
 Hoby Brenner
 Lou Brock Jr.
 Booker Brown
 Tay Brown – College Football Hall of Fame
 Joey Browner
 Keith Browner
 Will Buchanon
 Brad Budde – College Football Hall of Fame
 David Buehler
 Rudy Bukich
 Frank Buncom
 DeChon Burns
 Reggie Bush – Heisman Trophy winner, since vacated
 Ray Butler
 Dominique Byrd
 Dave Cadigan
 Lynn Cain
 Leo Calland
 Al Carmichael
 Mark Carrier
 Chris Cash
 Matt Cassel
 Bob Chandler
 Chris Claiborne – Butkus Award winner
 Travis Claridge
 Don Clark
 Monte Clark
 Leon Clarke
 Paul Cleary – College Football Hall of Fame
 Garry Cobb
 Shaun Cody
 Angelo Coia
 Keary Colbert
 Tony Colorito
 Curtis Conway
 Rashard Cook
 Marcus Cotton
 Al Cowlings
 Jeff Cravath
 Lindon Crow
 Sam Cunningham
 Brian Cushing – NFL Pro Bowler
 Mario Danelo
 Anthony Davis – College Football Hall of Fame
 Clarence Davis
 Fred Davis
 Derrick Deese
 Jack Del Rio
 Hershel Dennis
 Kori Dickerson
 Don Doll
 Morley Drury – College Football Hall of Fame
 Coye Dunn
 Dennis Edwards
 Sedrick Ellis
 Kevin Ellison
 Riki Ellison
 Dick Enright
 Ricky Ervins
 Charlie Evans
 Charlie Evans – former NFL running back
 Vince Evans
 Justin Fargas
 John Ferraro – College Football Hall of Fame
 Craig Fertig
 Bob Fisher
 Jeff Fisher
 Bill Fisk
 James Fitzpatrick
 Chris Foote
 Cole Ford
 Lonnie Ford
 Roy Foster
 Scott Galbraith
 Mike Garrett – College Football Hall of Fame, Heisman Trophy winner; USC Athletic Director (1993–2010)
 Norberto Garrido
 Mike Garzoni
 William Gay
 David Gibson
 Frank Gifford – College Football Hall of Fame, Pro Football Hall of Fame; TV analyst
 Bill Gray
 Matt Grootegoed
 Gregg Guenther
 Pat Haden – All-American QB; Rhodes Scholar; NFL Pro-Bowler; TV analyst, current Athletic Director USC
 Willie Hall
 Mike Haluchak
 Brandon Hancock
 Travis Hannah
 Jim Hardy
 Pat Harlow
 Cary Harris
 Carter Hartwig
 Bob Hendren
 Ed Henke
 Ed Hervey
 Ralph Heywood
 Jesse Hibbs
 Donnie Hickman
 Fred Hill
 Jess Hill
 Bob Hoffman
 John Hoffman
 Lamont Hollinquest
 Alex Holmes
 Mike Holmgren
 Leroy Holt
 Hudson Houck
 Pat Howell
 Mike Hull
 John Jackson
 Lawrence Jackson
 Dwayne Jarrett
 Gary Jeter
 Keyshawn Johnson
 Rob Johnson
 Winston Justice
 Mort Kaer – College Football Hall of Fame
 Ryan Kalil
 Norm Katnik
 Brian Kelly
 Kareem Kelly
 Ryan Killeen
 David Kirtman
 Bob Klein
 Sammy Knight
 Jeff Kopp
 Al Krueger
 Jason Leach
 Brad Leggett
 Matt Leinart – Heisman Trophy winner
 Dave Lewis
 Karl Lorch
 Ronnie Lott – College Football Hall of Fame, Pro Football Hall of Famer
 Oscar Lua
 Taitusi Lutui
 Malaefou MacKenzie
 Kaluka Maiava
 Tom Malone
 Todd Marinovich
 Rod Martin
 Bruce Matthews
 Clay Matthews Jr.
 Clay Matthews III – NFL Pro Bowler, Super Bowl Champion
 Grant Mattos
 Fred Matua
 Rey Maualuga
 Ray May
 Taylor Mays
 Bob McCaffrey
 Earl McCullouch
 Sultan McCullough
 Daylon McCutcheon
 Mike McDonald
 Paul McDonald
 Tim McDonald
 Chris McFoy
 Willie McGinest
 Larry McGrew
 Marlin McKeever
 Mike McKeever – College Football Hall of Fame
 Dan McMillan
 Robert McNeish
 Johnny McWilliams
 John Michels
 Billy Miller
 Jason Mitchell
 Ron Mix – Pro Football Hall of Famer
 Fili Moala
 Marv Montgomery
 Kyle Moore
 Zeke Moreno
 Boyd Morgan
 Daniel Morgan
 Pat Morris
 Chad Morton
 Johnnie Morton
 Don Mosebar
 Gerry Mullins
 Anthony Munoz – Pro Football Hall of Famer
 Jim Musick
 Bill Nelsen
 Rick Neuheisel (J.D. 1988) – Head Coach (played football at UCLA)
 Jim Obradovich
 Ifeanyi Ohalete
 Pat O'Hara
 Dan Owens
 Carson Palmer – Heisman Trophy winner
 Petros Papadakis
 Mike Patterson
 Rodney Peete
 Nick Perry
 Volney Peters
 Charles Phillips
 Erny Pinckert – College Football Hall of Fame
 Kennedy Pola
 Troy Polamalu – All-American; NFL Pro Bowler; Super Bowl Champion
 Will Poole
 Ryan Powdrell
 Marvin Powell – College Football Hall of Fame
 Jim Psaltis
 Marc Raab
 Chilo Rachal
 Bill Radovich
 Drew Radovich
 Mike Rae
 LaJuan Ramsey
 Danny Reece
 Kris Richard
 Bernard Riley
 Steve Riley
 Keith Rivers
 C. R. Roberts
 Jacob Rogers
 Aaron Rosenberg – College Football Hall of Fame, 2x All-American, and film and television producer
 Tim Rossovich
 Karl Rubke
 Frostee Rucker
 Ken Ruettgers
 Darrell Russell
 Tim Ryan
 Eddie Saenz
 Paul Salata
 Sean Salisbury – ESPN football analyst
 Mark Sanchez – 2009 Rose Bowl Offensive MVP
 Mike Sanford
 Dallas Sartz
 Henry Schmidt
 Bill Schultz
 Jim Sears
 Junior Seau – NFL Pro Bowler
 Jason Sehorn
 Rocky Seto
 Rod Sherman
 Antuan Simmons
 O. J. Simpson – Heisman Trophy winner, College Football Hall of Fame; Pro Football Hall of Fame
 Tony Slaton
 Dennis Smith
 Ernie Smith – College Football Hall of Fame
 Harry Smith – College Football Hall of Fame
 Sid Smith
 Steve Smith – NFL Pro Bowler
 Tody Smith
 R. Jay Soward
 Matt Spanos
 Markus Steele
 Bob Svihus
 Lynn Swann – College Football Hall of Fame, Pro Football Hall of Fame; TV analyst
 Calvin Sweeney
 Lofa Tatupu – NFL Pro Bowler
 Mosi Tatupu
 Brice Taylor
 Mike Taylor
 Skip Thomas
 Terrell Thomas
 Dennis Thurman
 Mark Tucker
 Patrick Turner
 Kenechi Udeze
 Keith Van Horne
 Lenny Vandermade
 John Vella
 Jim Vellone
 Kyle Wachholtz
 Lowell Wagner
 Glen Walker
 John Walker
 Cotton Warburton – College Football Hall of Fame
 Scott Ware
 Chauncey Washington
 Charlie Weaver
 Lee Webb
 Charles White – Heisman Trophy winner, College Football Hall of Fame
 LenDale White
 Brian Williams
 Eric Williams
 Johnny Williams
 Kyle Williams
 Mike Williams – NFL first round draft pick
 Thomas Williams
 Matt Willig
 Ben Wilson
 Richard Wood – College Football Hall of Fame
 Willie Wood – Pro Football Hall of Fame
 Manuel Wright
 Justin Wyatt
 Ron Yary – College Football Hall of Fame, Pro Football Hall of Fame
 Adrian Young – All-American
 Charle Young – College Football Hall of Fame

Baseball 

 Gabe Alvarez
 Brian Bannister
 Bret Barberie – former Major League Baseball infielder; Olympic gold medalist
 Jim Barr (B.S. B.A. 1970) – former Major League Baseball pitcher
 Aaron Boone – professional baseball player 1997–2009
 Bret Boone – professional baseball player 1992–2005
 Bill Bordley
 Damon Buford
 Don Buford
 Jeff Cirillo
 Jeff Clement
 Rich Dauer
 Rod Dedeaux (B.S. B.A. 1935) – legendary USC Trojans baseball coach and member of 1935 Brooklyn Dodgers
 Lucas Duda
 Dave Engle
 Morgan Ensberg – professional baseball player, 2000–present, 2005 all-star
 Seth Etherton
 Ron Fairly – former Major League Baseball player and broadcaster
 Randy Flores
 Ron Flores
 Mike Gillespie
 George Grande
 Jess Hill
 Geoff Jenkins – professional baseball player 1998–present
 Randy Johnson – professional baseball pitcher 1988–2009
 Jacque Jones – professional baseball player 1999–present
 Steve Kemp – professional baseball player 1977–1988
 Ian Kennedy
 Dave Kingman – professional baseball player 1971–1986
 Rene Lachemann – former MLB manager
 Jason Lane – professional baseball player 2002–present
 Barry Latman – professional baseball player
 Bill Lee
 Justin Lehr
 Bob Lillis
 Fred Lynn – professional baseball player 1974–1990
 Mark McGwire – professional baseball player 1986–2001
 Chad Moeller
 Eric Munson – professional baseball player 2000–present
 Stu Pederson – Major League baseball player
 Mark Prior – professional baseball player 2003–2013
 Anthony Reyes
 Tom Seaver (B.A. 1975) – professional baseball Hall of Fame pitcher 1967–1986
 Al Silvera (1935–2002), major league baseball player
 Bob Skube
 Roy Smalley – professional baseball player 1975–1987
 Mark Smith
 Robert Stock (born 1989) – MLB baseball pitcher
 Garrett Stubbs (born 1993) – baseball catcher
 Gary Sutherland
 Bobby Valentine – professional baseball pitcher 1969–1979, MLB Manager 1985–2012
Ben Wanger (M.S. '20), American-Israeli baseball pitcher, Team Israel
 Barry Zito – professional baseball pitcher 2000–present

Basketball

Golf

Tennis

Olympians

Miscellaneous

Business

Film and television

Music

Performing arts

Politics and government

Presidents and prime ministers

Cabinet ministers and secretaries

Governors 
 Jim Gibbons (attended graduate school in the 1980s) – 28th Governor of Nevada
 Fred Hall (B.A. 1938, LL.B. 1941) – 33rd Governor of Kansas
 Tomás Yarrington (M.P.A. 1986) – former Governor of Tamaulipas, Mexico

United States Senators 
 Dean Heller (B.S. 1985) – United States Senator from Nevada
 Thomas H. Kuchel (B.A. 1932, LL.B. 1935) – former U.S. Senator from California
 Jim Webb (attended the college 1963–1964) – U.S. Senator from Virginia

Members of the United States House of Representatives

Jurists

U.S. Court of Appeals judges

U.S. District Court for the Central District of California judges

Other U.S. federal court judges

California Supreme Court Justices

Other jurists 
 You Chung Hong (LL.B. 1924, LL.M. 1925) – first Chinese American admitted to practice in California
 Charles Older – California Superior Court judge presiding over trial of Charles Manson; one of the famed Flying Tigers pilots of WWII
 William A. Reppy (LL.B. 1937) – Associate Justice of the California Second District Court of Appeal, Division Five (1968–1972)
 Mabel Walker Willebrandt (J.D. 1916, LL.M. 1917) – U.S. Assistant Attorney General, 1921–1929

Military

Ambassadors

Presidential staff 
 Herbert G. Klein (B.A. 1940) – former White House Communications Director
 Fred Ryan (B.A. 1977, J.D. 1980) – Assistant and Chief of Staff for Ronald Reagan
 Donald Segretti (B.A. 1963) – political operative for Richard Nixon
 Ron Ziegler (B.A. 1961) – former White House Press Secretary

State officials

Miscellaneous

Print and broadcast media

Other

Notable faculty members

A–K

L–Z

References

External links 
 USC Alumni Association website
 About USC Faculty

University of Southern California people

University of Southern California people